Tony Ortiz is a sportscaster and sports talk show host for  CBS Radio owned sister stations WXYT-FM, WXYT-AM and WWJ in Detroit, MI.

Broadcasting career

Education and early positions
After he graduated from Cooley High School in Detroit,  Tony enrolled at Specs Howard School of Media Arts. In 1986, Ortiz began his radio career as an intern at WXYT-AM, where he later he gained a paid position with the station. He first worked as a producer for Michigan State basketball and football. In 1991, Ortiz left WXYT-AM and joined sister station WWJ, going on to produce Detroit Lions football.

In 1994, Ortiz moved from Detroit to work in Houston, TX at KTRH as a reporter and show host covering Houston sports. Ortiz moved from KTRH to competing Houston sports station in  KILT in 1999   before returning to Detroit in 2001.

Current roles
Since 2001 from 2016, Ortiz has provided  sideline reports for the Detroit Lions Radio Network. He also co-hosted the network's pre-game show The Lions Roundtable and flagship station WXYT-FM's local pre-game show Lions Game Day. He was joined by play-by-play announcer Dan Miller and color commentator Jim Brandstatter, and on The Lions Round Table, Detroit Free Press Lions beat writer Nick Cotsonika.  He is also a Detroit Lions and Detroit Tigers beat reporter for WXYT-FM / AM  and provides sports updates during the breaks of some WXYT-FM / AM and WWJ shows. He also hosts a weekly Lions discussion show on the station during the regular season. He also appears on Fox 2 SportsWorks, WJBK-TV's weekly local Detroit sports talk show. He also frequently appears on WJBK Sports segments such as Lions Beat Writer Cross Fire.

References

Year of birth missing (living people)
Living people
American sports radio personalities
American talk radio hosts
American television personalities
Radio personalities from Detroit
National Football League announcers
Detroit Lions announcers